The Sigmund Freud Prize or Sigmund Freud Prize for Academic Prose (German: Sigmund Freud-Preis für wissenschaftliche Prosa) is a German literary award named after Sigmund Freud and awarded by the Deutsche Akademie für Sprache und Dichtung (German Academy for Language and Literature). It was first awarded in 1964.

The Sigmund Freud Prize and philosophy
In 1967, the Sigmund Freud Prize was awarded for the first time to a philosopher, Hannah Arendt. , ten of its recipients were philosophers writing in the German language, among them Hannah Arendt (1967), Ernst Bloch (1975), Jürgen Habermas (1976), Hans-Georg Gadamer (1979), Hans Blumenberg (1980), Odo Marquard (1984), Günther Anders (1992), Kurt Flasch (2000), Klaus Heinrich (2002), and  Peter Sloterdijk (2005).

The Sigmund Freud Prize is amongst the most prestigious academic prizes in Germany.

Winners

 1964 Hugo Friedrich, classicist
 1965 Adolf Portmann, zoologist
 1966 Emil Staiger, scholar of German language and literature
 1967 Hannah Arendt, philosopher
 1968 Karl Barth, Theologian
 1969 Bruno Snell, linguist (ancient languages)
 1970 Werner Heisenberg, physicist
 1971 Werner Kraft, literary historian
 1972 Erik Wolf, jurist (lawyer)
 1973 Karl Rahner, theologian
 1974 Günter Busch, art historian
 1975 Ernst Bloch, philosopher
 1976 Jürgen Habermas, philosopher
 1977 Harald Weinrich, classicist
 1978 Siegfried Melchinger, theatrical historian
 1979 Hans-Georg Gadamer, philosopher
 1980 Hans Blumenberg, philosopher
 1981 Kurt von Fritz, linguist (ancient languages)
 1982 Arno Borst, historian
 1983 Peter Graf Kielmansegg, political scientist
 1984 Odo Marquard, philosopher
 1985 Hermann Heimpel, historian
 1986 Hartmut von Hentig, education studies
 1987 Gerhard Ebeling, theologian
 1988 Carl Friedrich von Weizsäcker, physicist and philosopher
 1989 Ralf Dahrendorf, political scientist
 1990 Walther Killy, literary scholar
 1991 Werner Hofmann, art historian
 1992 Günther Anders, philosopher
 1993 Norbert Miller, literary scholar
 1994 Peter Gülke, musicologist
 1995 Gustav Seibt, historian
 1996 Peter Wapnewski, scholar of German language and literature
 1997 Paul Parin, ethno-psychologist
 1998 Ilse Grubrich-Simitis, psychologist
 1999 Reinhart Koselleck, historian
 2000 Kurt Flasch, philosopher
 2001 Horst Bredekamp, art historian
 2002 Klaus Heinrich, philosopher
 2003 Walter Burkert, classicist
 2004 Karl Schlögel, historian
 2005 Peter Sloterdijk, philosopher
 2006 Johannes Fried, historian
 2007 Josef H. Reichholf, evolutionary biologist
 2008 Michael Hagner, physician and historian of science
 2009 Julia Voss, art historian and journalist
 2010 Luca Giuliani, archeologist
 2011 Arnold Esch, historian
 2012 Ernst-Wolfgang Böckenförde, lawyer
 2013 Angelika Neuwirth, Arabist
 2014 Jürgen Osterhammel, historian
 2015 , linguist
 2016 Jan Assmann, Egyptologist
 2017 Barbara Stollberg-Rilinger, historian
 2018 , art historian
 2019 , philosopher
 2020 Ute Frevert, historian
 2021 Hubert Wolf, church historian
 2022 , philosopher

References

External links

Deutsche Akademie für Sprache und Dichtung

Sigmund Freud
German non-fiction literary awards
Philosophy awards